Liliana Neto (born 29 January 1997) is an Angolan sprinter. She competed in the women's 100 metres event at the 2016 Summer Olympics.

References

External links
 

1997 births
Living people
Angolan female sprinters
Athletes (track and field) at the 2016 Summer Olympics
Olympic athletes of Angola
Sportspeople from Luanda
Olympic female sprinters